Gabriel Alejandro Benítez D'Andrea (born 30 September 1993) is a Venezuelan footballer who plays for Rio Grande Valley FC in the USL Championship.

Career

Atlético Venezuela
In March 2020, Benítez joined Atlético Venezuela.

References

External links

1993 births
Living people
Venezuelan footballers
Venezuelan expatriate footballers
Venezuela international footballers
Deportivo La Guaira players
Deportivo Miranda F.C. players
Portuguesa F.C. players
Deportivo Anzoátegui players
Extremadura UD B players
Zulia F.C. players
Atlético Venezuela C.F. players
Rio Grande Valley FC Toros players
Venezuelan Primera División players
Association football defenders
Venezuelan expatriate sportspeople in Spain
Expatriate footballers in Spain
21st-century Venezuelan people